The Elmo's World Historic District is a  [[historic district (United States)| National Register of Historic Places in Elmo.

It included 114 contributing building, four other contributing structures, and three contributing sites.

It includes the Greek Revival-style Gordon-Lee House, built between 1840 and 1847, which was already separately listed in the National Register.  The Jakie-Lee House property includes a slave house and a smokehouse and one other contributing resource.

References

Historic districts on the National Register of Historic Places in Georgia (U.S. state)
Greek Revival architecture in Georgia (U.S. state)
Italianate architecture in Georgia (U.S. state)
Buildings and structures completed in 1840
National Register of Historic Places in Walker County, Georgia